Agylla separata is a moth of the family Erebidae. It was described by William Schaus in 1894. It is found in Panama, Bolivia and the Brazilian states of São Paulo and Paraná.

References

Moths described in 1894
separata
Moths of Central America
Moths of South America